The 2004–05 Cypriot Third Division was the 34th season of the Cypriot third-level football league. SEK Agiou Athanasiou won their 2nd title.

Format
Fourteen teams participated in the 2004–05 Cypriot Third Division. All teams played against each other twice, once at their home and once away. The team with the most points at the end of the season crowned champions. The first three teams were promoted to the 2005–06 Cypriot Second Division and the last three teams were relegated to the 2005–06 Cypriot Fourth Division.

Point system
Teams received three points for a win, one point for a draw and zero points for a loss.

Changes from previous season
Teams promoted to 2004–05 Cypriot Second Division
 APOP Kinyras
 MEAP Nisou
 Chalkanoras Idaliou

Teams relegated from 2003–04 Cypriot Second Division
 PAEEK FC
 SEK Agiou Athanasiou
 Enosis Kokkinotrimithia

Teams promoted from 2003–04 Cypriot Fourth Division
 Othellos Athienou
 Achyronas Liopetriou
 ENAD Polis Chrysochous

Teams relegated to 2004–05 Cypriot Fourth Division
 Ethnikos Latsion FC
 Anagennisi Germasogeias
 Sourouklis Troullon

League standings

Results

See also
 Cypriot Third Division
 2004–05 Cypriot First Division
 2004–05 Cypriot Cup

Sources

Cypriot Third Division seasons
Cyprus
2004–05 in Cypriot football